París is a corregimiento in Parita District, Herrera Province, Panama with a population of 1,070 as of 2010. Its population as of 1990 was 1,024; its population as of 2000 was 1,131.

References

Corregimientos of Herrera Province